Kopervik Tidende was a Norwegian newspaper, published in Kopervik, Karmøy in Rogaland county.

Kopervik Tidende was started in 1912. It went defunct in 1931.

References

1912 establishments in Norway
1931 disestablishments in Norway
Defunct newspapers published in Norway
Mass media in Karmøy
Newspapers published in Norway
Norwegian-language newspapers
Newspapers established in 1912
Publications disestablished in 1931